Kelleronia is a genus of flowering plants belonging to the family Zygophyllaceae.

Its native range is Northeastern Tropical Africa, Southern Arabian Peninsula.

Species:

Kelleronia gillettiae 
Kelleronia revoilii 
Kelleronia splendens

References

Zygophyllaceae
Rosid genera